The Ministry of Transportation and Infrastructure is the British Columbia government ministry responsible for transport infrastructure and law in the Canadian province of British Columbia. It is currently led by Rob Fleming.

The ministry is responsible for the planning of transportation networks, providing transportation services and infrastructure, developing and implementing transportation policies, and administering many transportation-related acts and regulations. Its responsibilities include ports, airports, public transit, ferry services, roads and cycling networks. The ministry is also responsible for the following Crown Corporations: BC Transportation Financing Authority, BC Railway Company, BC Transit, the Transportation Investment Corporation, the Insurance Corporation of British Columbia and the BC Pavilion Corporation.

Mandate
The purpose of the Ministry of Transportation and Infrastructure is to: 
 Create an integrated and safe transportation network that incorporates all modes of transport, including rail transit, reflects regional priorities, and provides a strong foundation for economic growth; and;
 Maintain and improve the provincial highway system, ensuring the safe and efficient movement of people and goods provincially, nationally and internationally

History 
The history of the ministry can be traced back to 1854 when three road commissioners were appointed to oversee the expenditure of the first appropriation of £500.
 In 1858, the Department of Lands and Works was created under the Chief Commissioner of Lands and Works.
 In 1871, a Constitutional Act set up the Land and Works Department to locate, construct, and maintain highways and bridges.
 On May 7 1908, a separate Department of Public Works was formed and placed under a Minister of Public Works.
 On March 15, 1955, highways became the responsibility of the new Department of Highways and on June 30, 1976, the Department of Highways and Public Works.
 On September 27, 1977, the Ministerial Titles Amendment Act was passed and the department became a ministry.
 On December 5, 1978, Transportation and Communication were added to the portfolio and the title became the Ministry of Transportation, Communications, and Highways.
 On November 23, 1979, the Ministry of Transportation and Highways was established.
 On June 5, 2001, the name of the ministry changed to Ministry of Transportation.
 On June 23, 2008, the name of the ministry changed to Ministry of Transportation and Infrastructure.

Organization
The ministry is organized into five different departments:
 Finance and Management Services Department
 The Finance and Management Services Department supports the ministry's financial and administrative activities.
 Highways Department
 The Highways Department is the delivery arm of the ministry, responsible for planning, building operating and maintaining the ministry's transportation infrastructure, including providing information on Drivebc. The department is also home to the Commercial Vehicle Safety Enforcement Branch.
 To deliver its mandate, the Highways Department has several offices in communities throughout the province. The offices are organized by region and then by district:
 South Coast Region
 Lower Mainland District
 Vancouver Island District
 Southern Interior Region
 Rocky Mountain District
 West Kootenay District
 Okanagan-Shuswap District
 Thompson Nicola District
 Cariboo District
 Northern Region
 Peace District
 Fort George District
 Bulkley-Stikine District
 Skeena District
 Infrastructure Department
 The Infrastructure Department is responsible for the ministry's transportation investment plan and oversees infrastructure grant programs. It also oversees the ministry's involvement in the Evergreen Line and the marine branch, which looks after the ministry's responsibilities related to coastal and inland ferries.
 Partnerships Department
 The Partnerships Department is responsible for property procurement and management, project governance and corporate initiatives, operations and procurement and the Transit Branch, which looks after the Provincial Transit Plan.
 Transportation Policy & Programs Department
 The focus of the Transportation Policy & Programs Department is the province's surface, air and marine policy, Pacific Gateway Strategy, as well as the Passenger Transportation Branch, which supervises commercial passenger vehicles.

Ministry inventory
The ministry looks after a large number of transportation-related assets, including:
 Border Crossings	53
 Alberta	24
 Alaska	1
 Idaho	2
 Montana	1
 Northwest Territories	1
 Washington	17
 Yukon Territory	7
 Changeable Message Signs	52
 Culverts**	183,962
 Gravel Reserve	2,744
 Guardrail*** 	16,375
 Large Culverts (> diameter)	652
 Large Other Tunnels* (Generally > Width)	83
 Large Retaining Walls ( height) 	1,090
 Other Tunnels*	300
 Railway Level Crossings	651
 Rest Areas 	174
 Retaining Walls** 	556
 Road Tunnels (> width)	69
 Sign Structures	217
 Signs**	247,493
 Snowsheds	4
 Total Road Kilometres	47,647 (Miles )
 Traffic Signals	694

Of Note: *Includes: pedestrian/cattle/animal tunnels** Inventory currently being updated*** Count of Guardrail locations

Ferries
The Ministry of Transportation is responsible for the provision of inland ferry services on the province's rivers and lakes, although it generally contracts the operation of these services to private sector companies. The ferries provided by the ministry include:
Adams Lake Cable Ferry, across Adams Lake
Arrow Park Ferry, across the Arrow Lakes at Arrow Park
Barnston Island Ferry, across an arm of the Fraser River between Barnston Island and Port Kells
Big Bar Ferry, across the Fraser River at Big Bar
Francois Lake Ferry, across Francois Lake from Francois Lake to Southbank
GladeFerry, across the Kootenay River
Harrop Cable Ferry, across the Kootenay River
Kootenay Lake Ferry, across Kootenay Lake between Balfour and Kootenay Bay
Little Fort Ferry, across the North Thompson River
Lytton Ferry, across the Fraser River at Lytton
McLure Ferry, across the North Thompson River
Needles Cable Ferry, across the Arrow Lakes at Needles
Upper Arrow Lake Ferry, across the Arrow Lakes between Shelter Bay and Galena Bay.
Usk Ferry, across the Skeena River at Usk

Coastal ferry services are not the direct responsibility of the Ministry of Transportation and Infrastructure. Instead they are provided by BC Ferries.

References

External links
 

Transport in British Columbia
British Columbia government departments and agencies
British Columbia
Public works ministries
Transport organizations based in Canada